Narayanavanam is a census town in Tirupati district of the Indian state of Andhra Pradesh. It is the headquarters of Narayanavanam mandal in Sri Kalahasti revenue division. The town is known for Kalyana Venkateswara Temple dedicated to Lord Venkateswara and  constructed in 1541 AD.

Geography

Demographics
At the 2011 India census, Narayanavanam had a population of 37,041 (50% male and 50% female). The average literacy rate was 64%, lower than the national average of 74%: male literacy was 72% and female literacy 56%. 11% of the population were under 6 years of age. Telugu is the official language of the town.

Education
Primary and secondary school education is provided by government, aided and private schools, under the state's School Education Department. The medium of instruction followed by different schools is English and Telugu.

See also 
List of census towns in Andhra Pradesh

References 

Census towns in Andhra Pradesh
Mandal headquarters in Tirupati district